Manuel Correia may refer to:

 Manuel Correia (composer) (1600–1653), Portuguese Baroque composer
 Manuel Pio Correia (1874–1934), Portuguese botanist
 Manuel Correia (footballer) (born 1962), Portuguese football manager and former centre-back

See also
 Manuel Correa (footballer) (born 1993), Mexican football midfielder